Kelso is an unincorporated community in Desha County, Arkansas, United States. The community is located at the intersection of Arkansas Highway 1 and Arkansas Highway 138.

References

Unincorporated communities in Desha County, Arkansas
Unincorporated communities in Arkansas